is a passenger railway station located in the city of Tsuyama, Okayama Prefecture, Japan, operated by West Japan Railway Company (JR West).

Lines

Station layout
The station consists of one ground-level side platform serving a single  bi-directional track. There is no station building and the station is unattended.

Adjacent stations

History
Mimasaka-Ōsaki Station opened on November 28, 1934. With the privatization of the Japan National Railways (JNR) on April 1, 1987, the station came under the aegis of the West Japan Railway Company.

Passenger statistics
In fiscal 2019, the station was used by an average of 22 passengers daily..

Surrounding area
Tsuyama Municipal Osaki Elementary School
 Japan National Route 181

See also
List of railway stations in Japan

References

External links

 Mimasaka-Ōsaki Station Official Site

Railway stations in Okayama Prefecture
Kishin Line
Railway stations in Japan opened in 1934
Tsuyama